Wonders of the Sea 3D is a 2017 American documentary film co-directed by Jean-Michel Cousteau and narrated by Arnold Schwarzenegger.

Background
Schwarzenegger expressed the hope that the film would do for marine conservation what the film Saturday Night Fever (1977) did for disco dancing, and what the film Pumping Iron (1977), in which Schwarzenegger starred, did for gym memberships.
When the film was screened at the 2017 San Sebastián International Film Festival, Schwarzenegger argued

Filming and casting
The documentary was filmed over three years in locations ranging from Fiji to the Bahamas.

The cast includes Céline Cousteau, Fabien Cousteau, and Jean-Michel Cousteau.

Critical reviews
The film has been reviewed in US media that include Variety and The Hollywood Reporter.
The film has also been reviewed in Canada by the Toronto Star, the National Post, The Globe and Mail, The Georgia Straight,Now Magazine,Original Cin, 
and What She Said,
in Spain by El País,
in the Philippines by the Philippine Daily Inquirer,
and in Italy by Mymovies.it and Comingsoon.it''.

References

External links
Film website

Reviews (aggregated) at Rotten Tomatoes

3D documentary films